The 1986 Basque Pelota World Championships were the 10th edition of the Basque Pelota World Championships organized by  the FIPV.

Participating nations

Others

Events
A total of 12 events were disputed, in 4 playing areas.

Trinquete, 5 events disputed

Fronton (30 m), 2 events disputed

Fronton (36 m), 4 events disputed

Fronton (54 m), 1 event disputed

Medal table

References

World Championships,1986
1986 in sports
Sport in Vitoria-Gasteiz
International sports competitions hosted by Spain
1986 in Spanish sport
World Championships,1986
World Championships